Sciousness, a term coined by William James in The Principles of Psychology, refers to consciousness separate from consciousness of self. James wrote:

When James first introduced "sciousness" he held back from proposing it as a possible prime reality in The Principles of Psychology, warning that it "traverse[s] common sense." He allowed that he might return to a consideration of sciousness at the conclusion of the book, where he would "indulge in some metaphysical reflections," but it was not until two years later in his conclusion to the abridged edition of The Principles that he added:

 
Then thirteen years later, writing solely as a philosopher, James returned to his "parenthetical digression" of sciousness that "contradict[ed] the fundamental assumption of every philosophic school." James had founded a new school of philosophy, called "radical empiricism," and nondual sciousness was its starting point. He even wrote a note to himself to "apologize for my dualistic language, in the Principles." James did not continue to use the word "sciousness" in later essays on radical empiricism, but the concept is clearly there as the "plain, unqualified ... existence" he comes to call "pure experience," in which there is "no self-splitting ... into consciousness and what the consciousness is of."

Pure experience sciousness was mostly attacked when first presented. With some notable exceptions, such as Bergson, Dewey, and Whitehead, Western philosophers rejected James' view. That rejection continues to this day.

One of the first to appreciate James's concept was the Swiss psychologist Theodore Flournoy, a mentor of Jung. In a book about James he wrote:

The 20th century philosopher Kitaro Nishida—introduced to James by D.T. Suzuki—compared James's concept of sciousness and his phrase "pure experience" to tathata or suchness.

Yet James scholars today still do not agree on how receptive James himself remained to sciousness. As psychologist Benny Shanon observed recently:

References

Bibliography
 Andrew Bailey, "The Strange Attraction of Sciousness: William James on Consciousness" (1988), Transactions of the Charles S. Peirce Society 34, pp. 414–434 
 Jonathan Bricklin, Ed., Sciousness, Guilford, CT: Eirini Press, 
 William James, The Principles of Psychology, with introduction by George A. Miller (1890/1983), Cambridge, Mass: Harvard University Press, paperback, 
 William James, Psychology (Briefer Course) (1892), University of Notre Dame Press 1985: , New York: Dover Publications 2001: 
 Thomas Natsoulas, "The sciousness hypothesis: Part I" (1996), Journal of Mind and Behavior 17 (1): 45–66
 Kitaro Nishida, An Enquiry into the Good (1992), Tr. by Masao Abe & Christopher Ives, New Haven: Yale University Press
 Eugene Taylor and Robert Wozniak, eds., Pure Experience: The response to William James (1996), Bristol, England: Thoemnes

External links
A Great Consciousness Shift Is Happening

Conceptions of self
Consciousness
Consciousness studies
Psychological concepts
1890s neologisms